Srirangam is a state assembly constituency in Tiruchirappalli district in Tamil Nadu. Its State Assembly Constituency number is 139. It comes under Tiruchirappalli Lok Sabha constituency for Parliament elections. It is one of the oldest assembly segments in Tamil Nadu existence since 1952 election. It is one of the 234 State Legislative Assembly Constituencies in Tamil Nadu, in India.
The Devendrakula Velalar, Mutharaiyar and Brahmin play a major role in Srirangam assembly constituency, as a majority of voters are from these communities.

Madras State

Tamil Nadu – Srirangam

Election results

2021

2016

2015 Bye-election
Due to the conviction and jailing of then Chief Minister and MLA J Jayalalithaa in the Misappropriate Assets Case in September 2014, the MLA position became vacant. Bye-elections were announced.

2011

2006

2001

1996

1991

1989

1984

1980

1977

1971

1967

1962

1957

1952

Notes

References 
 

Assembly constituencies of Tamil Nadu
Tiruchirappalli district